Marmelade (Creole: Mamlad) is an arrondissement in the Artibonite department of Haiti.
It has 120,193 inhabitants.
Postal codes in the Marmelade Arrondissement start with the number 45.

The arrondissement consists of the following municipalities:
 Saint-Michel-de-l'Atalaye
 Marmelade

References

Arrondissements of Haiti
Artibonite (department)